The Cope reaction or Cope elimination, developed by Arthur C. Cope, is an elimination reaction of the N-oxide to form an alkene and a hydroxylamine.

Mechanism and applications
The reaction mechanism involves an intramolecular 5-membered cyclic transition state, leading to a syn elimination product, an Ei pathway. This organic reaction is closely related to the Hofmann elimination, but the base is a part of the leaving group. The amine oxide is prepared by oxidation of the corresponding amine with an oxidant such as meta-chloroperoxybenzoic acid (mCPBA). The actual elimination just requires heat.

Illustrative of the Cope reaction is a synthesis of methylenecyclohexane:

Piperidines are resistant to an intramolecular Cope reaction but with pyrrolidine and with rings of size 7 and larger, the reaction product is an unsaturated hydroxyl amine. This result is consistent with the 5-membered cyclic transition state.

Reverse reaction
The reverse or retro-Cope elimination has been reported, in which an N,N-disubstituted hydroxylamine reacts with an alkene to form a tertiary N-oxide. The reaction is a form of hydroamination and can be extended to the use of unsubstituted hydroxylamine, in which case oximes are produced.

Related processes
Sulfoxides can undergo an essentially identical reaction to produce sulfenic acids which is important in the antioxidant chemistry of garlic and other plants of the genus Allium. Selenoxides likewise undergo selenoxide eliminations. Other Ei reactions proceed similarly.

References 

Elimination reactions
Olefination reactions
Name reactions